CKO was a Canadian radio news network which operated from 1977 to 1989. The CKO call sign was shared by twelve network-owned stations, as listed below.

The network was owned by Canada All-News Radio Ltd. AGRA Industries was originally a 45 percent partner in the network, but by 1988 it was the sole owner. David Ruskin was the network's founding president.

History
On July 12, 1976, the Canadian Radio-television and Telecommunications Commission (CRTC) approved a licence for CKO to Canada All News Radio Limited. Twelve transmitters were required to be in place across the country and ready for broadcast by the fall of 1979.

With a recorded message from Prime Minister Pierre Trudeau to launch it, the CKO radio network started broadcasting on July 1, 1977 with stations in Ottawa and Toronto. Power problems delayed the start of the Ottawa station by an hour. Stories included much American content, plus two features about prostitutes. One announcer mispronounced Arkansas several times in one newscast and was reportedly dismissed.

Later that year, stations were added in Montreal (by acquisition of AM station CFOX), London, Vancouver and Calgary. The Vancouver station began with a news staff of ten, including news director Cam Scott, Gerry Gifford, Richard Dettman, Stan Crossley, Bill Rodger, Norm Bright and Joanna Piros. Scott was replaced in 1978 by Peter Ray, who had been transferred from the Montreal station. After Ray's departure that year, Tom Spear was hired from CHWK Chilliwack in December 1978 until most local programming was curtailed in August 1980.

The news network began live broadcasts of the Canadian government's Question Period in late 1977; for nearly all Canadians, it was the first regular, live access to House proceedings as it would be well over two years before the CBC Parliamentary Television Network began regular nationwide video distribution to most cable systems.

In November 1977, the Calgary station was opened with Bob Quinn as its first news director. He expanded coverage in Alberta and was instrumental in the network's coverage of the Kosmos 954 satellite crash in the Northwest Territories in January 1978 and the crash of Pacific Western Airlines Flight 314 in Cranbrook, BC a few weeks later. Reporter Bill Pringle was the first journalist at the crash scene. Calgary coverage centered on local news and the booming Alberta energy sector. The Calgary and Edmonton reporters joined forces to broadcast the 1978 Commonwealth Games in Edmonton.  The Calgary stationed featured numerous local features reflecting the skills on the staff and balanced network's national approach.  Calgary and Edmonton produced a regional afternoon newscast, "Alberta Today".  It was often co-anchored by Cliff Oginski in Edmonton and Calgary's Bill Pringle.

In 1978, a station was added in Edmonton under station manager/news director Garfield Chesson. He made CKO Edmonton a key supplier of national news reportage in the era of the Trudeau government's National Energy Program. Edmonton journalists Cliff Oginski, Ian Kinsey, Karen Brown and Bob Unger balanced a perceived Toronto slant to national issues.

CKO closed the London studio that year due to poor ad sales.

After its first anniversary, the network faced low ratings and higher financial losses than expected. However, it was hoped that a planned advertising campaign would help boost awareness of the station. The Toronto transmitter power was also to be increased to 100,000 watts in by the end of 1978.

CKO began live sports broadcasts for Toronto Maple Leafs hockey and National Football League football in late 1978. CKFH previously carried the Maple Leafs games and attempted to have the CRTC stop CKO's hockey broadcasts. The CRTC rejected CKFH's complaint, on the rationale that sports broadcasts were within CKO's programming commitments.

In 1985, CKO added a station in Halifax.

Maclean-Hunter sold its Newsradio broadcast syndication division to CKO in August 1987.

In 1986, CKO applied to convert its Montreal outlet to 95.1 MHz; that application was denied on March 19, 1987. (95.1 FM has since been occupied by CBF-FM, after that station's relocation from 690 kHz in 1998.) On June 20, 1989, the commission approved an application by changing the frequency from 1470 kHz to 650 kHz, as a way to improve reception in areas of Montreal Island; CKO's frequency change proposal was never implemented.

In 1988, CKO filed an application with the CRTC to trade frequencies with Toronto AM station CKEY. The transaction would have included a payment of $4 million to CKO which the network would have used to launch three more stations (Regina, Saint John and St. John's) for which it already held licenses, but had not been financially able to establish. However, the CRTC denied the application on April 25, 1988. Later the same year, AGRA transferred its 99% ownership in CKO to its majority-owned media division, Cybermedix. In March 1989, the network under its restructured ownership declared to the CRTC that it would no longer have financial losses by 1993.

Later that year, CKO established a station in Winnipeg, which became the network's final new station before its closure.

Ted Tevan briefly hosted a weekday sports talk show on the network.  Although Tevan was from Montreal, CKO's Montreal station did not have a suitable studio for the program, forcing Tevan to commute to Toronto. Tevan quit CKO after the network rejected his offer to set up a Montreal studio.

In 1989, AGRA agreed in principle to sell Cybermedix to Montreal-based broadcaster Cogeco, which planned to sell off Cybermedix' medical labs while keeping CKO and the Cybermedix cable systems in Ontario, Saskatchewan, Alberta and British Columbia.  However, there was no timetable for the CRTC to approve the deal, and Cogeco would not be allowed to operate CKO until the sale was approved.  As a result, with the transaction still pending before the CRTC and no prospect of staunching CKO's mounting losses in the interim, AGRA decided to euthanize the network.  On November 10, network president Bill Stewart told employees via conference call that CKO was shutting its doors.  While this meeting was taking place, the network abruptly went off the air in the middle of the noon (Eastern Time) broadcast, never to return. It lost a reported $55 million during its existence.

The broadcast licenses were surrendered to the CRTC, which formally revoked them on August 15, 1990.

Personalities
Personalities associated with the network included:Lowell Thomas, Calgary news presenter.

Programs
 Herbert W. Armstrong, weekdays and Sundays 9:30 p.m.
 Bookshelf, book review show hosted by Dawn Draper.
 The John Gilbert Show
 Hotline, hosted by Pat Burns
 Nighttalk With Bill Williams, national talk-show from Vancouver, replacing The John Gilbert Show
 Open Portfolio, Ottawa-based capital affairs programme hosted by Noel Norenius, Saturdays at 1:07 p.m. ET.
 People Probe, national person-in-the-street show hosted by Earl Sky (Earl Pludwinski), Saturdays at 12:07 p.m. ET.
 Science File, hosted by Glen Stone
 Soccer Report, Edmonton based pre-NASL open line show created and hosted by Ian Kinsey in 1978 and '79. Canada's first soccer call-in and feature program
 Spacewatch, hosted by David Onley
 This is Business, national half hour daily business show 6 - 6:30pm eastern hosted, produced and written by John MacRae '84 - '88
 Time to Talk, national open line show hosted by Don Gauthier from 1985
 Toronto Maple Leafs hockey games
 Alberta soccer league, games play-by-play host Ian Kinsey
 Wall Street Report, hosted by Larry Wachtel
 Wineview, hosted by Andrew Sharp

Transmitters

† The stations in Regina, Saint John and St. John's were licensed by the CRTC but had not been launched by the network before its shutdown.

Studios
CKO's main studios and offices in Toronto were initially at 59-65 Adelaide Street East, Toronto - a vacant 6 storey building next to the Adelaide Street courthouse, and then moved to the 2nd floor of the Carlton Inn Hotel on Carlton Street just west of Maple Leaf Gardens from 1981 to 1988.

See also

 680 News - succeeding all-news radio station in Toronto in 1993

References

External links
Canadian Communications Foundation article on CKO - Canadian Communications Foundation
Canadian Communications Foundation article on CFOX
Canadian Communications Foundation article on news radio

Defunct Canadian radio networks
KO
Radio stations established in 1977
Radio stations disestablished in 1989
Cogeco radio stations
News and talk radio stations in Canada
1977 establishments in Ontario
1989 disestablishments in Ontario
KO
KO
KO
KO
KO
KO
KO
KO
KO